What's the Worst That Could Happen? is a 2001 American comedy film directed by Sam Weisman and starring Martin Lawrence and Danny DeVito. Loosely based on the book of the same name by Donald E. Westlake, the film's supporting cast includes John Leguizamo, Bernie Mac, Larry Miller, Nora Dunn, GQ, and William Fichtner.

Upon its release on June 1, 2001, the film was a commercial disappointment as it brought in only $38.4 million worldwide on a $60 million budget.

Plot

Kevin Caffrey, a thief and connoisseur, meets Amber Belhaven, who is auctioning off her father's painting to pay a hotel bill. He asks her which hotel room she's staying at, seemingly under the pretense of sleeping with her, and shows up to her room with the painting she auctioned off, having stolen it. Kevin tells Amber about his stealing business, which shocks Amber at first, but she accepts it in order to be with Kevin. She later gives Kevin her father's lucky ring.

Elsewhere, Max Fairbanks, a snarky businessman whose company, TUI, is going into bankruptcy, is going over with his lawyer, Walter Greenbaum, on how to save his company. Walter is exhausted as Max does not take the proceeding seriously and still spends freely, even asking to declare bankruptcy immediately without trying to budget so his assets are protected. He tells his wife, Lutetia Fairbanks, that his company is in a technical procedure to disguise what his company is really going into.

Kevin learns about Max from his friend Berger, a fellow thief who happens to know what places to hit. Berger tells him about Max's current situation with his company, as well as what he couldn't access due to the critical condition of the chapter 11 bankruptcy code, which includes going into his beachfront mansion. When the two go to rob Max, Max manages to capture Kevin and call the police. Before the police take Kevin away, Max spots Amber's ring and tells the police that the ring was also stolen, forcing Kevin to hand over the ring. After escaping from the police, Kevin returns to the beach house to get his ring back from Max, but fails to find him. Angry at Max, Kevin finishes off what he started by robbing Max of the valuables inside the house and one of Max's three cars outside. Kevin tells Amber that the ring was stolen from him.

The next day, Walter informs Max he was banned from his summer house and his being there breached the terms of his bankruptcy. Max says he'll be fine, believing the ring to be a lucky charm. Meanwhile, Kevin and Berger hire Shelly Nix, a computer hacker, to track Max's whereabouts by hacking into his e-mail. During an airplane flight, Max talks to his associate Gloria, a psychic, about the ring. Gloria consults her cards, and draws a king with five daggers on his head. Shocked at the result, Gloria doesn't tell Max what she drew and pretends that her phone connection is breaking up. Max meets a judge that he thought he paid off to keep his house, but his insults lead to the judge ordering him to sell his house and his contents at a public auction.

After the crooks rob another one of Max's houses, Max meets with Detective Alex Tardio of the Robbery Division and calls his head of security, Earl Redburn.

Kevin finds out from Shelly that Max is going to Washington, D.C., for a Senate hearing and has an apartment there. There, Kevin learns that Max intends to secretly bribe the senators and replaces the bribe money with insulting notes in Max's name. Max and Earl later storm into the apartment, having deduced Kevin's presence there. In the ensuing scuffle, Kevin tries to steal back the ring, but instead steals Max's wedding ring. Afterwards, Amber decides that Kevin's feud with Max has gone too far and that she no longer cares about the ring. While Max later addresses the Senate Committee, he gets a call from Kevin who tells him that if Max will give him his ring back he will give him back his. Max refuses and proceeds to repeatedly curse at Kevin, appearing to be speaking to the senators, and other viewers. This results in the hearing ending poorly for Max. Upon returning to his apartment in Philadelphia, Walter quits as his lawyer and Earl tells him that he was hacked.

Kevin goes to his uncle Jack, the owner of a local bar he and Amber used to meet at, to find out where she is. Jack warns Kevin to stop robbing Max out of personal conflict and to forget about the ring, although he changes his mind about the warning upon hearing from Berger how much they could get out of robbing Max.

Max gets a call from Lutetia about Max's behavior on TV, and tells him not to come home, while Amber breaks up with Kevin due to his obsession with Max and the ring. Lutetia finds Amber at Jack's bar wearing a jacket of hers that Kevin stole from their house and confronts her. Amber tells her that Max stole the ring she gave to Kevin. Knowing that they are both in the same situation, they come up with a plan.

Gloria, thinking about Max, still draws the same card and decides to come clean. Noticing how bad it is, she tells him to put an end to it, but Max still refuses to give up Kevin's ring. Realizing Max's arrogant determination to keep the ring, she quits being his associate, and goes to Tardio to give him Max's company records.

At the bankruptcy auction, Lutetia tells Max that she wishes him well and sends him a masseuse. While Earl keeps looking out for Kevin through his monitors, the crooks steal as much as they can and flee. Windham plants smoke bombs to obscure their escape and calls the fire brigade. Later on, Shelly plants a video of Kevin delivering a message to Max that he was being robbed without him being there on Earl's monitors. Enraged, Max goes out into the smoke to find Kevin, but a firefighter, actually Kevin in disguise, drags him out of the smoke and steals the ring. Kevin steals Max's boat to escape, but Max jumps onto the boat and struggles with Kevin to get back the ring. While hitting a buoy, causing the boat to sink, they find out that the ring is a fake, the ring having an inscription inside it that said: "Grow up.", a message that they both got from their lovers. Max realizes that Lutetia had induced the masseuse to steal the ring during his massage.

When Tardio finds Max and Kevin, Kevin tells him that he was saving Max. Max corroborates his story, telling Tardio that he had never met Kevin. Kevin thanks Max and tells him that he owes him one. While going back to the hotel where Amber used to be before she moved in with Kevin, she shows him the ring, revealing that she was the masseuse. She tells Kevin that the ring had bad luck and that he should throw it away. Kevin agrees and flings the ring out of sight and gets back together with Amber. Kevin, pretending to be Max's lawyer, fixes the Senate hearing and goes into the press conference victorious. When it is over, Max and Kevin part ways. As they do so, Kevin steals one of Max's watches.

Cast

Reception

Critical reception
What's the Worst That Could Happen? currently holds a 10% "rotten" rating on review aggregation website Rotten Tomatoes based on 99 reviews, with an average rating of 3.5/10, and the site's consensus stating: "Talented cast is squandered by an uninvolving script filled with unfunny gags." Another review aggregation website Metacritic, which assigns a normalized rating out of 100 from top mainstream critics, calculated a score of 37 based on 28 reviews.

Roger Ebert of the Chicago Sun-Times gave the film an unfavorable review, stating that there were "too many characters, not enough plot, and a disconnect between the two stars' acting styles". Lisa Schwarzbaum of Entertainment Weekly also gave the film a negative review and said, "Maybe the worst thing that can happen is that every other movie at the multiplex will be sold out this weekend."

Kevin Thomas of the Los Angeles Times gave a mixed review and said, "Laborious in the unfolding of its plot, and under Sam Weisman's brash direction the unbashed amorality of the material is crass rather than sly in tone".

However, some positive reviews came from Chris Kattenbach of the Baltimore Sun and Mike Clark of USA Today.

Box office performance
The film had $13,049,114 during its opening weekend, and ranked #5 at the box office. It was released in 2,675 theaters, and grossed $4,878 average. At the end of its theatrical run, What's the Worst That Could Happen? has grossed $32,269,834 in the domestic market along with $6,194,297 in the foreign market for a worldwide total of $38,464,131. Therefore, the film was a box office flop, failing to recover its $60 million budget.

Soundtrack

A soundtrack containing hip hop and R&B music was released on May 21, 2001 by Interscope Records. It peaked at 38 on the Billboard 200 and 6 on the Top R&B/Hip-Hop Albums.

Marc Shaiman, who wrote the score, told Playbill magazine that the "worst job" he ever had was "scoring a hideous movie called What's the Worst That Could Happen? I'm not kidding."

References

External links
 
 
 
 
 

2001 films
2000s crime comedy films
American crime comedy films
American Sign Language films
2000s English-language films
Films scored by Tyler Bates
Films directed by Sam Weisman
Films set in Massachusetts
Hyde Park Entertainment films
Metro-Goldwyn-Mayer films
American films about revenge
Films based on American novels
Films based on works by Donald E. Westlake
Fictional portrayals of the Boston Police Department
2001 comedy films
Films produced by David Hoberman
2000s American films